Mike (Miguel) Beedle was an American theoretical physicist turned software engineer who was a co-author of the Agile Manifesto.

He was the co-author of the first book and earliest papers about Scrum. Later he coined the term "Enterprise Scrum," developed his ideas into a canvases-based approach, and promoted Enterprise Scrum as a framework for scaling the practices and benefits of Scrum across entire organizations.

Agile Manifesto

In 2001 Beedle was one of the seventeen people who created and signed the Manifesto for Agile Software Development. He had been invited by Martin Fowler and Robert C. Martin because of his involvement in the early adoption of Scrum and the organizational patterns community. Beedle was one of the first to follow in implementing Scrum after Jeff Sutherland and Ken Schwaber, and collaborated on writing the Scrum patterns article, which was the second published paper on Scrum.

The Agile Uprising podcast has published an interview with Beedle from Snowbird ski resort, where he collaborated on the creation of the Agile Manifesto. Beedle recalled that he had proposed the term "Agile" which ultimately filtered through a process of selection with the other signatories:

"I can tell you I came up with that word (Agile) because I was familiar with the book Agile Competitors and Virtual Organisations. We had proposed Adaptive, Essential, Lean and Lightweight. We did not want to use Adaptive because Jim Highsmith had given this to one of his works. Essential sounded overly proud. Lean had already been taken. Nobody wanted to be a lightweight. We did this late in the second day and it took only a few minutes to decide on this."

Scrum

He was the second adopter of Scrum, and contributed to the framework development by implementing into his companies and coaching other organizations in the same direction.

The main idea behind Scrum was to create a team that would resemble artificial life, a robot, or an adaptive system, that would adapt and learn through "social intelligence." Mike Beedle had a Ph.D. in Physics, and his master's thesis was about chaotic and non-linear systems. Joining this two concepts was what allowed Ken Schwaber, Jeff Sutherland and Mike Beedle to point about "creating a team at the edge of chaos". Both directions pointed to the same end game: creating a hyper-productive team that worked as an adaptive system at the edge of chaos through patterns.

In 2001, Beedle worked with Ken Schwaber to describe the method in the book, Agile Software Development with Scrum. Scrum's approach to planning and managing product development involves bringing decision-making authority to the level of operation properties and certainties.

Contributions to Agile and Scrum Worlds

His ideas about how to optimize a team in front of chaos, evolved from his personal research at University, later contributed to Agile Manifesto conception, and during his entire professional life continuously evolving and improving Agile approaches to the entire organization, and sharing all this knowledge around the World by participating in every kind of Agile events.

Mike Beedle and his companies have introduced Scrum, Enterprise Scrum and Business Agility, to tens of thousands of people and thousands of companies, providing training, consulting, mentoring, and coaching. He is the creator of the Enterprise Scrum framework and was the first CEO to manage an entire company in an Agile way using Enterprise Scrum. He was a keynote speaker at countless Agile and Scrum conferences worldwide.

Works

 SCRUM: An extension pattern language for hyperproductive software development (the second published paper on Scrum).

Death

Beedle was killed in Chicago in an apparent robbery.

After his death, Scrum creator Jeff Sutherland posted, "The Scrum and Agile community lost a giant this weekend. Mike Beedle was a close friend and inspiration to many of us."  The Scrum Alliance said, "Mike and his companies have introduced Scrum, Enterprise Scrum and Business Agility, to tens of thousands of people and thousands of companies, providing training, consulting, mentoring, and coaching. He is the creator of the Enterprise Scrum framework and was the first CEO to manage an entire company in an Agile way using Enterprise Scrum. He was a keynote speaker at countless Agile and Scrum conferences world-wide."

References

External links
 Scrum.org
 http://wiki.c2.com/?MikeBeedle

1962 births
2018 deaths
American computer scientists
Extreme programming
American technology writers
American computer programmers
Agile software development